In algebraic geometry, the flag bundle of a flag

of vector bundles on an algebraic scheme X is the algebraic scheme over X:

If X is a point, then a flag bundle is a flag variety and if the length of the flag is one, then it is the Grassmann bundle; hence, a flag bundle is a common generalization of these two notions.

Construction 
A flag bundle can be constructed inductively.

References 

 
Expo. VI, § 4. of 

Algebraic geometry